The 2017 Texas A&M–Kingsville Javelinas football team represented Texas A&M University–Kingsville in the 2017 NCAA Division II football season. They were led by third-year head coach Daren Wilkinson. The Javelinas played their home games at Javelina Stadium and were members of the Lone Star Conference.

Schedule
Texas A&M–Kingsville announced its 2017 football schedule on December 3, 2016. The schedule consists of five home and six away games in the regular season. The Javelinas will host LSC foes Tarleton State, Texas A&M-Commerce, and West Texas A&M and will travel to Angelo State, Eastern New Mexico, Midwestern State, Texas-Permian Basin, and Western New Mexico.

The Javelinas will host two of the three non-conference games against Central Washington from the Great Northwest Athletic Conference (GNAC) and William Jewell from the Great Lakes Valley Conference and will travel to Simon Fraser also from the GNAC.

Rankings

References

Texas AandM-Kingsville
Texas A&M–Kingsville Javelinas football seasons
Texas AandM-Kingsville Football